The 2008–09 Villanova Wildcats men's basketball team represented Villanova University in the 2008–09 NCAA Division I men's basketball season. They were led by Jay Wright in his eighth year as head coach of the Wildcats. The Wildcats played their home games at The Pavilion on the school's campus as members of the Big East Conference. They finished the season 30–8, 13–5 in Big East play to finish in fourth place. They lost in the semifinals of the Big East tournament to Louisville. The Wildcats received an at-large bid to the NCAA tournament as the No. 3 seed in the East region. They defeated American, UCLA, Duke, and Pittsburgh to advance to the Final Four. In the Final Four they were defeated by the eventual national champion for the second straight year, North Carolina.

Previous season 
The Wildcats finished the 2007–08 season 22–13, 9–9 in Big East play to finish in a tie for eighth place. The Wildcats lost in the quarterfinals of the Big East tournament to Georgetown. They received an at-large bid to the NCAA tournament where they defeated Clemson and Siena to advance to the Sweet Sixteen. There they lost to the eventual national champions, Kansas.

Offseason

Recruiting class of 2008

Source

|-
| colspan="7" style="padding-left:10px;" | Overall Recruiting Rankings:     Scout – NR     Rivals – NR      ESPN – NR 
|}

Roster

Season
Before the season began, on October 22, 2008, the Wildcats were selected to finish fifth among the 16 Big East Conference teams in the annual preseason coaches' poll at Madison Square Garden. As part of recent tradition, the 2008 Hoopsmania (an on-campus kickoff of the Villanova Basketball season), included a performance by hip-hop artist T-Pain. Previous artists have included 50 Cent, Tony Yayo and MIMS.

The Villanova-Pitt game on January 28, 2009 was the last game to be held at the Wachovia Spectrum which drew a crowd of 17,449. The Wildcats finished perfect the year at the Pavilion. Villanova's 25 regular-season wins tied a school record. It had been done three times before, but not since 1950–51.

During the 2009 Big East Awards Ceremony, head coach Jay Wright was named the 2009 Big East Coach of the Year. He won the award twice in the previous four years. Villanova senior forward Dante Cunningham was named the Big East's Most Improved Player, and sophomore guard Corey Fisher won the Sixth Man Award. Cunningham, a senior forward, won second-team honors on the all-Big East team, while junior guard Scottie Reynolds took honorable mention.

Schedule and results

|-
!colspan=9 style=| Exhibition

|-
!colspan=9 style=| Non-conference regular season

|-
!colspan=9 style=|Big East regular season

|-
!colspan=9 style=|Big East tournament

|- 
!colspan=9 style=|NCAA tournament

Rankings

*AP does not release post-NCAA tournament rankings.

References

Villanova
Villanova Wildcats men's basketball seasons
Villanova
NCAA Division I men's basketball tournament Final Four seasons